Vanessa Bell (née Stephen; 30 May 1879 – 7 April 1961) was an English painter and interior designer, a member of the Bloomsbury Group and the sister of Virginia Woolf (née Stephen).

Early life and education 

Vanessa Stephen was the elder daughter of Sir Leslie Stephen and Julia Prinsep Duckworth. The family included her sister Virginia, brothers Thoby (1880–1906) and Adrian (1883–1948), half-sister Laura (1870–1945) whose mother was Harriett Thackeray and half-brothers George and Gerald Duckworth; they lived at 22 Hyde Park Gate, Westminster, London. She was educated at home in languages, mathematics and history, and took drawing lessons from Ebenezer Cook before she attended Sir Arthur Cope's art school in 1896. She then studied painting at the Royal Academy in 1901.

Later in life, she said that during her childhood she had been sexually abused by her half-brothers, George and Gerald Duckworth.

Personal life

After the deaths of her mother in 1895 and her father in 1904, Vanessa sold 22 Hyde Park Gate and moved to Bloomsbury with Virginia and brothers Thoby and Adrian, where they met and began socialising with the artists, writers and intellectuals who would come to form the Bloomsbury Group. The Bloomsbury Group's first Thursday evening meetings began at Bell's house in Gordon Square. Attendees included: Lytton Strachey, Desmond MacCarthy and, later on, Maynard Keynes, Leonard Woolf, Roger Fry, and Duncan Grant.

In 1907, Vanessa married Clive Bell. They had two sons, Julian (who died in 1937 during the Spanish Civil War at the age of 29) and Quentin. The couple had an open marriage, both taking lovers throughout their lives. Bell had affairs with art critic Roger Fry and with the painter Duncan Grant, with whom she had a daughter, Angelica in 1918, whom Clive Bell raised as his own child.

Vanessa, Clive, Duncan Grant, and Duncan's lover David Garnett moved to the Sussex countryside shortly before the outbreak of the First World War, and settled at Charleston Farmhouse near Firle, East Sussex. John Maynard Keynes was also a close friend and frequent member of the household, until his relationship with Lydia Lopokova, whom Bell disliked.

At Charleston, Bell and Grant painted and worked on commissions for the Omega Workshops, established by Roger Fry. Her first solo exhibition was at the Omega Workshops in 1916.

On 7 April 1961, Bell died from a brief illness at Charleston, Firle and was buried in the Firle Parish Churchyard. When Duncan Grant died in 1978, he was buried next to her.

Art

In 1906, when Bell started to think of herself as an artist, she formed the Friday Club to create a place in London that was more favourable to painting. Vanessa was encouraged by the Post-Impressionist exhibitions organised by Roger Fry, and she copied their bright colours and bold forms in her artworks. In 1914, she turned to Abstraction.

Bell rejected the examples of Victorian narrative painting and rejected a discourse on the ideal and aberrant qualities of femininity. She also designed book jackets for all of her sister Virginia's books that were published by Virginia and Leonard Woolf's publishing company, the Hogarth Press.

Bell is one of the most celebrated painters of the Bloomsbury group. She exhibited in London and Paris during her lifetime, and has been praised for innovative works and for her contributions to design.

Bell's paintings include Studland Beach (1912), The Tub (1918), Interior with Two Women (1932), and portraits of her sister Virginia Woolf (three in 1912), Aldous Huxley (1929–1930) and David Garnett (1916). Bell also worked with Duncan Grant to create murals for Berwick Church in Sussex (1940–42).

In 1932, Bell and Grant were commissioned to produce a dinner service for Kenneth Clark. With oversight from Kenneth's wife Jane Clark, they produced the Famous Women Dinner Service: 50 plates painted with portraits of notable women throughout history. The collection eventually passed on to a private collector, and passed out of public view until 2017. The full collection was exhibited in London in early 2018.

Exhibitions
In the summer of 1909, Iceland Poppies (1908) was exhibited at the New English Art Club. It was praised by Walter Sickert and marks Bell's artistic maturity.

Designs for a Screen: Figures by a Lake (1912), gouache on board, was influenced by Nabis paintings by Édouard Vuillard and Maurice Denis and might have been a part of Bell's exhibit Design for Screen, which was shown at the Friday Club Exhibition in February 1912.

In 1916, Bell's first solo exhibition was held in the Omega Workshop in London, a prominent place for exhibitions which supported young artists and introduced design work to the public. Bell had become the director of the Omega Workshop around 1912.

Design for Overmantel Mural (1913), oil on paper, depicts herself and Molly MacCarthy naked in Bell's studio at 46 Gordon Square.

Street Corner Conversation (also created in 1913) features four individuals in conversation amidst massive geometrical forms.

Summer Camp (1913), oil on board, illustrates a summer camp organized at Brandon on the Norfolk-Suffolk border near Thetford.

By the Estuary (1915), oil on canvas, is a modestly scaled landscape showing her fondness for clarity of design in which segments of contrasting color harmonize.

Nude with Poppies (1916), oil on canvas, is a preliminary design for a headboard which Bell painted for Mary Hutchinson.

In 1920, she painted a mysterious, narrative painting, “The Party,” which she exhibited in May 1922 at the prestigious London Group Exhibition but was “not for sale.” The painting was prominently illustrated and praised in British Vogue June 1922 but then disappeared for 61 years until sold by the Anthony d’Offay Gallery from the estate of Virginia Woolf with the title of “Mrs. Dalloway’s Party.”  It is unknown who retitled it, and the 
novel, “Mrs. Dalloway,” was not published till 1925.

In 2021, Bell was one of four featured women artists at an exhibition at the Laing Gallery, Newcastle.

Media portrayal
Bell was portrayed by Janet McTeer in the Dora Carrington biopic Carrington (1995), and by Miranda Richardson in the film The Hours (2002).

Bell is the subject of the Susan Sellers  novel Vanessa and Virginia (2010) and of the Priya Parmar novel Vanessa and Her Sister (2014). She was portrayed by Phoebe Fox and Eve Best in the BBC mini-series Life in Squares (2015).

Bell was portrayed by Emerald Fennell in the film Vita and Virginia (2018).

See also
List of Bloomsbury Group people

References

Bibliography 

 
 
 Sketches in Pen and Ink, Vanessa Bell
 A Passionate Apprentice: the early journals, Virginia Woolf
 A Moment's Liberty, Virginia Woolf
 A Very Close Conspiracy: Vanessa Bell and Virginia Woolf, Jane Dunn
 Duncan Grant, Frances Spalding
 Deceived with Kindness: a Bloomsbury Childhood, Angelica Garnett
 Elders and Betters, Quentin Bell
 Vanessa and Virginia, Susan Sellers (fictional biography)
 Charleston, Quentin Bell and Virginia Nicholson
 Virginia Woolf, Hermione Lee
 Vanessa and Her Sister, Priya Parmar (novel)

External links

 
 Official site of the Charleston Farmhouse in Sussex
 A presentation by the Tate Gallery, including biographies, timeline, pictures etc
 Links to Vanessa Bell's works online
 
 

1879 births
1961 deaths
20th-century English women artists
Alumni of King's College London
Bloomsbury Group
English women painters
English interior designers
Stephen-Bell family
Virginia Woolf
People from Westminster
People from Firle